Pramface is a British sitcom starring Scarlett Alice Johnson and Sean Michael Verey. Written by Chris Reddy, the first series, comprising six half-hour episodes, piloted on 23 February 2012. The second series, which was commissioned by the BBC before the first series had even aired, began transmission on 8 January 2013 with an hour-long special as the first episode. The remaining six episodes of the series were of the usual half-hour length. A third series was commissioned which began airing on 25 February 2014 with the double episode series finale, which aired on 25 March 2014, bringing the third series to a total of six half-hour episodes. It was confirmed in August 2014 that a fourth series will not be commissioned.

Plot
Best friends Jamie, Mike, and Beth finish their GCSE exams and head towards a sixth form party. Meanwhile, 18-year-old Laura, encouraged by her best friend Danielle, breaks her parents' curfew and heads to the same party; both Jamie and Laura are determined to have a good time. During the party they meet and drunkenly have sex. The next morning Jamie writes Laura a note with his phone number on it and leaves. Some few weeks later, Laura discovers that she is pregnant, and that Jamie is only 16. Life is about to begin, but not in the way either of them expected.

Series 1 follows the life of the two teenagers and their family and friends as they try to get to grips with the impending parenthood and the struggles of pregnancy. Series 2 follows the next stage, caring for the newly born baby, Emily, while Laura faces the difficulties associated with being a new mother. Series 3 follows Jamie encountering a new woman in his life and how that affects his relationship with the mother of his child.

Production

Filming
The show was filmed in and around Edinburgh, Scotland, with specific locations including amongst others The Grange suburb and the Corstorphine parish church.

Cast
 Scarlett Alice Johnson as Laura Derbyshire
 Sean Michael Verey as Jamie Prince
 Dylan Edwards as Mike Fenton
 Yasmin Paige as Beth Mitchell
 Emer Kenny as Danielle Reeves
 Ben Crompton as Keith Prince
 Bronagh Gallagher as Sandra Prince
 Angus Deayton as Alan Derbyshire
 Anna Chancellor as Janet Derbyshire

Episodes

Series overview

Series 1 (2012)

Series 2 (2013)

Series 3 (2014)

International broadcast
 – Season 1 premiered in Australia on 3 January 2013 on ABC2.
 – All three seasons have been picked up by Netflix in the Netherlands.
 – All three seasons of the show have been picked up by Hulu in the United States.

Online
In addition to episode preview clips and character information on the BBC website, the writer and stars wrote blog posts about making the show for the BBC TV Blog and BBC Three Blog. An official Facebook page was set up for fans although this has since been closed and one of the main characters, Mike Fenton, was given his own Twitter account where he commented in-character on the events of the episodes as well as other things going on in the real world at the time.

References

External links

2012 British television series debuts
2014 British television series endings
2010s British teen sitcoms
BBC television sitcoms
English-language television shows
Teenage pregnancy in television
Television series about teenagers
Television shows set in Edinburgh
2010s British comedy-drama television series